Kazue Takuma (born 4 August 1974) is a Japanese former professional tennis player.

Takuma, who had a career high singles ranking of 233, made her WTA Tour main draw debut at Nagoya in 1995 and also twice qualified for the main draw of the Japan Open. As a doubles player she had her best year in 1996 when she won a $25,000 ITF title in Taipei and was runner-up in a WTA Tour tournament, the China Open. She featured in the singles qualifying draw for the 1997 Australian Open.

WTA Tour finals

Doubles (0-1)

ITF finals

Singles: 2 (0–2)

Doubles: 2 (1–1)

References

External links
 
 

1974 births
Living people
Japanese female tennis players